The Iran national badminton team represents Iran in international badminton team competitions. The national team of Iran is administered by the Badminton Federation of the Islamic Republic of Iran, also known as BFIRI. 

The Iranian junior badminton team competed in the Badminton Asia Junior Championships mixed team event in 2011. The team were eliminated in the group stages.

Participation in Badminton Asia competitions 

Mixed team U19

Current squad 

Men
Amir Jabbari
Mehran Shahbazi
Alireza Karami
Nima Rostampourlagaldani
Farzin Khanjani
Saleh Sangtarash
Saied Babayani
Soroush Freydouni

Women
Hajar Kabiri
Saghar Rafei
Yeganeh Seyedtafrishikhameneh
Nazanin Zamani
Sareh Aminian
Fatemeh Babaei
Mohammad Ali Faghih Khorsani
Sorayya Aghaei

References 

Badminton
National badminton teams
Badminton in Iran